Justice of the King's Bench, or Justice of the Queen's Bench during the reign of a female monarch, was a puisne judicial position within the Court of King's Bench, under the Chief Justice. The King's Bench was a court of common law which modern academics argue was founded independently in 1234, having previously been part of the curia regis. The court became a key part of the Westminster courts, along with the Exchequer of Pleas (qualified to hear cases involving revenue owed to the King) and the Court of Common Pleas (qualified to hear cases between subject and subject); the latter was deliberately stripped of its jurisdiction by the King's Bench and Exchequer, through the Bill of Middlesex and Writ of Quominus respectively. As a result, the courts jockeyed for power. In 1828 Henry Brougham, a Member of Parliament, complained in Parliament that as long as there were three courts unevenness was inevitable, saying that "It is not in the power of the courts, even if all were monopolies and other restrictions done away, to distribute business equally, as long as suitors are left free to choose their own tribunal", and that there would always be a favourite court, which would therefore attract the best lawyers and judges and entrench its position. The outcome was the Supreme Court of Judicature Act 1873, under which all the central courts were made part of a single Supreme Court of Judicature. Eventually the government created a High Court of Justice under Lord Coleridge by an Order in Council of 16 December 1880. At this point, the King's Bench formally ceased to exist.

The number of Justices at any one time varied; until 1348 it fluctuated between two and four, while between 1349 and 1391 there was only one. The number continued to change, but after 1522 was (in principle) fixed at three. Acts of Parliament in 1830 and 1868 provided funding for a fourth and fifth Justice respectively. Salaries were first established in 1278, with one Justice receiving 50 marks a year and the others 40. From 1307 all received 40, with additional pay increases resulting in each being paid £100 by 1389. Salaries of £1,000 a year were provided from 1645, increasing to £1,500 in 1714, £2,000 in 1759, £3,000 in 1799 and (after variations) the salary settled at £5,000 in 1828. In 1799 pension provisions were first made, starting at £2,000 a year and peaking at £3,500 in 1825.

List of Justices

References

Bibliography

See also
:Category:Justices of the King's Bench

Justice of the Court of King's Bench
Justice of the Court of King's Bench